The Yukon Party is a conservative political party in Yukon, Canada. It is the successor to the Yukon Progressive Conservative Party.

Formation 
With Prime Minister Brian Mulroney's Progressive Conservative federal government's decreasing popularity, the Yukon Progressive Conservatives decided to sever its relations with the federal Conservatives, and renamed itself the "Yukon Party" in 1991.

The party's first leadership convention in June 1991 was won by Chris Young, a 21-year-old former president of the Yukon Progressive Conservatives' youth chapter. However, two Progressive Conservative MLAs, Bea Firth and Alan Nordling, quit the party within days of his victory, and formed the Independent Alliance Party. 

By August, however, Young resigned as leader on the grounds that he felt the voters of Yukon were not prepared to support a party whose leader was so young and politically inexperienced, and John Ostashek was acclaimed as his successor in November after his sole challenger, Daniel Lang, dropped out of the race.

The Yukon Party won the 1992 election, and Ostashek became Premier of Yukon. He won only a minority government, and Nordling, Firth and Willard Phelps were all reelected as independents, but all three opted to support the Yukon Party on confidence and supply. Ostashek's government became very unpopular by increasing taxes and cutting services. The party was defeated in the 1996 election, winning only three seats and falling to third place for the first time behind the Yukon Liberal Party.

In the 1996 election Nordling returned to the party, and was defeated as a Yukon Party candidate, while Firth retired from politics.

Since 2000
The party's fortunes continued to decline at the 2000 general election. The Yukon Party was reduced to a single seat in the legislature as the right wing vote moved to the Yukon Liberal Party, putting the Liberals in power for the first time in the territory's history.

Liberal Premier Pat Duncan's government was plagued with internal dissent, however, and despite having won an outright majority of seats in the general election, defections and resignations reduced the Liberals to a minority government within two years. Premier Duncan called a snap election for 4 November 2002, in an effort to regain her majority, but the early election call backfired.

The Yukon Party had elected Dennis Fentie, a rural Member of the Yukon Legislative Assembly (MLA), who had defected from the Yukon New Democratic Party (NDP), as its new leader in June 2002. Despite being caught by surprise by the election call, the party was able to win a majority government with 12 seats compared to five for the NDP. The Liberals were reduced to a single seat. Fentie became the second Yukon Premier from a rural riding.

On 10 October 2006, the Yukon Party was re-elected, holding 10 seats in the Legislative Assembly. The Yukon Liberals won five seats and the Yukon New Democrats won three.

The party was defeated in the 2016 Yukon general election and served as the Official Opposition.

Currie Dixon led the party into the 2021 territorial election, the Yukon Party won 8 seats and won the popular vote overall. Dixon was personally elected in the district of Copperbelt North. On April 23, the incumbent Liberals were sworn in with a minority government. On April 28, the NDP announced that they had entered into a formal confidence and supply agreement with the Liberals.

Leadership elections

2011 leadership election
On May 28, 2011, a leadership election was held to replace Dennis Fentie. Darrell Pasloski was chosen after only one ballot.

2020 leadership election

On November 20, 2019, the party announced that it would hold a leadership election on May 23, 2020. On March 25, party president Mark Beese announced that the voting will take place over phone and online due to the COVID-19 pandemic. Currie Dixon was elected with 50.44% of the vote on the second ballot. Dixon took 752 votes to 682 for Brad Cathers. On the first ballot, Dixon fell short of a majority, with 694 votes to Cathers' 637. Longtime party staffer Linda Benoit finished third with 160 votes.

Election results

Leaders
Chris Young 0 1991
John Ostashek - 1991–2000
Peter Jenkins - 2000–2002 
Dennis Fentie - 2002–2011
Darrell Pasloski - 2011–2016
Stacey Hassard - 2016–2020 
Currie Dixon - 2020–present

See also
List of premiers of Yukon
List of Yukon Leaders of Opposition
Yukon Progressive Conservative Party
Yukon Freedom Party

References

External links
Yukon Party

Territorial political parties in Yukon
Political parties established in 1991
Conservative parties in Canada
1991 establishments in Yukon